Tijuana Toads is a series of 17 theatrical cartoons produced by DePatie–Freleng and released through United Artists.

Plot 
The series was about two toads, El Toro and Pancho, who live in the Mexican city of Tijuana. Throughout the cartoon they try to eat their prey, but always get outsmarted. They would sometimes themselves be targeted by a bird, Crazylegs Crane, and would in turn always outsmart him.

The series introduced two characters who later got their own series. The Blue Racer first appeared in "Snake in the Gracias" before getting his own series in 1972. Crazylegs Crane also spun off to his own series for television in 1978 on ABC. Both characters were voiced by Larry D. Mann, except in "Flight to the Finish" where Bob Holt voiced Crazylegs Crane.

El Toro was voiced by actor Don Diamond and Pancho voiced by Tom Holland. Crazylegs Crane was voiced by Larry D. Mann. Directorial duties were split between Hawley Pratt, Art Davis, Grant Simmons, and Gerry Chiniquy.

When the series began airing in 1976 as part of The Pink Panther Laugh and a Half Hour and a Half Show, it was re-dubbed and renamed Texas Toads to make the series less offensive. A laugh track was added to the new soundtrack, and the toads were given the new names of Fatso and Banjo. Producer David H. DePatie later commented on the process:

Filmography

Note 
Tijuana Toads is the fourth cartoon series to appear in the MGM Television distribution package.

Tijuana Toads broadcast it in channel of Cartoon Network and Boomerang.

Remade and reused scenes and plots 
 Tijuana Toads (first Episode, a.k.a. Tall in the Grass) reused scenes based from Tree for Two, Dr. Jerkyll's Hyde, and Two Crows from Tacos.
 A Pair of Greenbacks reused some scenes based on Mouse and Garden and Two Crows from Tacos.
 Go for Croak reused the drinking of nitroglycerin trick from Mouse Mazurka.
 Never on Thirsty reused scenes from The Honey-mousers.

Revivals 
The characters were resurrected for the 1993 TV series The Pink Panther. As the case when the original shorts were shown on TV, they were rebranded as the Texas Toads. The toads were redesigned as western sheriffs with oversized cowboy hats replacing their sombreros.

Home video

VHS 
In 1987, Go for Croak was released on VHS as part of Cartoon Festival.

DVD and Blu-ray 
In 2016, Kino Lorber released the complete series with the original soundtrack, digitally remastered from the original negatives and in the original ratio.

Popular culture 
A restaurant dubbed under the name Pancho i Toro - Pizza & Grill Sesvete is located in Sesvete, Croatia.

External links

References 

Animated duos
Animated film series
Toads
DePatie–Freleng Enterprises
Fictional duos
Fictional frogs
Film series introduced in 1969
Television series by MGM Television
The Pink Panther Show
Fictional Mexican people
Fictional anthropomorphic characters
Male characters in animation
Race-related controversies in animation
Ethnic humour
Stereotypes of Hispanic and Latino people